Intervarsity, Inter Varsity or Inter-Varsity may refer to:

All-Asian Intervarsity Debating Championships, now merged to form the United Asian Debating Championships.
Australasian Intervarsity Debating Championships
Australian Intervarsity Choral Societies Association
InterVarsity Christian Fellowship/USA
Inter-Varsity Christian Fellowship of Canada
Universities and Colleges Christian Fellowship, formerly the Inter-Varsity Fellowship of Evangelical Unions
 InterVarsity Choral Festival (Australia)
 InterVarsity Choral Festival (Canada)
Inter Varsity Dance Competition
InterVarsity Hockey, Field Hockey competitions in Australia between rival universities
Inter Varsity Folk Dance Festival
Inter-Varsity Press

See also
Varsity (disambiguation)